Samuel van Straalen (24 June 1845 – 8 December 1902) was a Dutch-born English Hebraist and librarian.

He emigrated to England in 1866, initially working as a teacher of French, German, and mathematics at Wilton College and St Andrew's College in Islington. He was appointed Hebrew librarian at the British Museum in 1873, following the deaths of Immanuel Deutsch and Joseph Zedner. In this role, he kept up serial publications and acquired important contemporary publications, including modern Hebrew and Yiddish belles-lettres.

Van Straalen translated many Dutch, German, and Hebrew books, including 's Gewroken (1892), and Alfred Hermann Fried's The Diary of a Condemned Man (1899). He is best known for his catalogue of the Hebrew books in the British Museum (London, 1894) supplementary to that by Joseph Zedner, with an index to both volumes. He also prepared a subject catalogue of the Hebrew collection, containing some 11,100 titles, which was left unpublished until 1991.

Partial bibliography

References
 

1845 births
1902 deaths
Bibliographers of Hebrew literature
British Hebraists
Dutch emigrants to England
Dutch–English translators
Dutch Hebraists
Dutch librarians
Employees of the British Museum
German–English translators
Latin–Hebrew translators
Librarians from London
People from Gouda, South Holland